Horns and Halos is the fourteenth album released by rapper, Andre Nickatina and his second with rapper Equipto. It was released on May 17, 2005 for Million Dollar Dream and featured production from Andre Nickatina, Nick Peace, Little J, Sweet Geez, Tone Capone and DJ Pause. Two sequels were released for the album, 2005's Gun-Mouth 4 Hire: Horns and Halos, Vol. 2 and 2006's Bullet Symphony: Horns and Halos 3.

Track listing
"Heelz"- 2:26
"Morire da Solo (Die Alone)"- 3:03
"Turf on Fire"- 3:33
"Bananas"- 2:17
"Close n Personal"- 2:18
"Boss Soss Talk"- 3:20
"Git Down"- 3:35
"Dedicate Yo Life 2 This P"- 1:54
"Tina Terry"- 3:04
"Blueberry Rain"- 3:30
"2 B U"- 3:31
"I'm Gone"- 4:10
"Upgrade Call"- 4:00
"Holla 4 Madonna"- 3:27
"These Clowns"- 3:41
"Somethin' Holy Like Qur'an"- 3:19

2005 albums
Andre Nickatina albums